German fries (also referred to as German fried potatoes) is a dish consisting of thinly sliced raw or cooked potatoes fried in fat like lard, butter or vegetable oils. Bacon and onion slices are common additional ingredients. Salt and pepper are always used for seasoning, while caraway, marjoram, rosemary and garlic are optional. By the 1870s, dishes under these names were listed in American and British cookbooks. In German, they are called Bratkartoffeln (literally fry-potatoes).

In the United States
During World War I in the United States, due to Germany being an enemy of the United States, "German" place names (such as Berlin, Ohio) and the adjective "German" were often expunged from the American language; by 1918, "French fries", shortened to "fries", had won the name game in the United States and Canada". During this time, the dish was sometimes referred to as "American fries", due to U.S. opposition to Germany during this time.

Preparation

Preparation may involve pan-frying or deep-frying the potatoes and the addition of ingredients such as cooked bacon, onion and green pepper. Some versions may use thinly sliced potatoes. Paprika may be added for flavor.
Whether raw or cooked potatoes are to be used, the latter either fresh or stored for some days and used only after ageing, remains a question of discussion, depending on personal taste, as well as regional influences.

German fries may be served with schnitzel, or as an accompaniment to sausages, such as bauernwurst. Some restaurants serve them as a side dish.

See also

 Bauernfrühstück
 Fried potatoes
 German cuisine
 Home fries
 List of deep-fried foods
 List of German dishes
 List of potato dishes

References

Potato dishes
German cuisine